Hafez Tahouni  is an Iranian retired football goalkeeper who played for Iran in the 1984 Asian Cup.

International Records

Honours 

Asian Cup:
Fourth Place : 1984

External links
Team Melli Stats

Living people
Iranian footballers
Association football goalkeepers
Year of birth missing (living people)
Iran international footballers